Maijchar is a union parishad of Bajitpur Upazila under Kishoreganj District in Dhaka Division, Bangladesh.

Demographics
According to the 2011 Bangladesh census, Maijchar Union had 3,282 households and a population of 16,619. The literacy rate (age 7 and over) was 22.5% (male: 24.7%, female: 20.4%).

Administration
Maijchar Union consists of 10 villages covering a total area of 22 km2:
 Aynargoup
 Baherbali
 Boyali
 Maijchar
 Parkochua
 Purakanda
 Shampur
 Shibpur

References

Kishoreganj District